Yuri Taguti (born 5 April 1966) is a Brazilian windsurfer. He competed in the men's Mistral One Design event at the 1996 Summer Olympics.

References

1966 births
Living people
Brazilian male sailors (sport)
Brazilian windsurfers
Olympic sailors of Brazil
Sailors at the 1996 Summer Olympics – Mistral One Design
Sportspeople from Niterói